The Victoria River is a river of the Northland Region of New Zealand's North Island. It flows generally northwest from the Maungataniwha Range, reaching the Awanui River to the east of Kaitaia.

See also
List of rivers of New Zealand

References

Far North District
Rivers of the Northland Region
Rivers of New Zealand